The German national beach handball team is the national team of Germany. It is governed by the German Handball Association and takes part in international beach handball competitions.

World Championships results
2006 – 7th place

External links
Official website
IHF profile

Beach handball
National beach handball teams
B